Saturnino is the Spanish, Portuguese, and Italian form of the name Saturninus.  As a first name, it can refer to:

Saturnino Arrúa, Paraguayan footballer
Saturnino Herrán, Mexican painter
Saturnino Rustrián, Guatemalan road bicycle racer
Saturnino Perdriel, Argentine founder of Club de Gimnasia y Esgrima La Plata
Saturnino and Mariano Lora, Cuban revolutionaries

Other uses
Manuel Saturnino da Costa 
Pernell Saturnino 
Fr. Saturnino Urios University